Oladosu Olumuyiwa Oshinowo (July 1941 – 13 August 2013) was a Nigerian politician who served as the first speaker of the Lagos State House of Assembly from 1979 to 1983, during the Second Nigerian Republic.

Early life
He was born in Ikorodu local government area of Lagos State, southwestern Nigeria in July 1941.
In 1979, he contested the Ikorodu constituency I seat of the Lagos State House of Assembly and was elected.
He was elected speaker on 2 October 1979 and served in this capacity till 5 October 1983.

References

1941 births
2013 deaths
Lagos State politicians
Speakers of the Lagos State House of Assembly